Lac is a resinous substance produced by insects. Lac may also refer to:

Places

Africa
 Lac Region, a district in Chad
 Lac Prefecture, a district in Chad

America
Rivière du Lac, a tributary of the Montmorency River, in Capitale-Nationale, Quebec, Canada

Europe
 Laç, a city in Albania
 Lac, a village in Voloiac Commune, Mehedinţi County, Romania
 Lac district, a district in the canton of Fribourg, Switzerland
 Lancing railway station, a railway station in Sussex, England (station code: LAC)

Elsewhere
 Lac, a standard astronomical constellation abbreviation of Lacerta 
 Latin America and the Caribbean or LAC, a regional definition by the United Nations

Other uses
 Lac, French for lake (body of water)
 lác, an element in Anglo-Saxon names meaning "fight, play"
Lac, a character in Arthurian romance, father of Erec
 LAC, the ICAO operator designator for Lockheed Corporation (Lockheed Aircraft Corporation), United States
 L.Ac., Licensed Acupuncturist, see Regulation of acupuncture
 Lac operon, abbreviated Lac, operon controlling the metabolism of lactose in bacteria such as E. coli
 Lac Viet, the ancient people of northern Vietnam, also called Lạc in Vietnamese and Luòyuè in Chinese
 Lakh, or Lac, a unit in the South Asian numbering system equal to one hundred thousand (100,000)
 An abbreviation for the Los Angeles Chargers, a professional football team
 An abbreviation for the Los Angeles Clippers, a professional basketball team

See also

 LAC (disambiguation)
 Lanthanum carbide (LaC2)
 
 
 
 Lack (disambiguation)
 Lak (disambiguation)
 Le Lac (disambiguation)